Chi Park, M.D. is a fictional character on the Fox medical drama House. Portrayed by Los Angeles born actress and comedian Charlyne Yi, she joins Dr. Greg House's team of diagnosticians in the department of Diagnostic Medicine at the fictional Princeton-Plainsboro Teaching Hospital in New Jersey based on Yale-New Haven Hospital.

Dr. Chi Park joins the diagnostic team in Season 8 after she hits her supervisor in the neurology department when he gropes her during a procedure. Dr. Park is introduced in the episode "Transplant", in which she joins Dr. House on a case.

Dr. Chi Park has been described as a "diminutive brainiac with often hilarious anger issues". Park was born in the United States and is of Korean and Filipino ancestry. Park lives with her parents, was a top student at medical school before becoming a neurology resident at Princeton-Plainsboro hospital.

References

House (TV series) characters
Fictional physicians
Television characters introduced in 2011
Fictional female doctors